The 2018 Internationaux de France was the sixth event of six in the 2018–19 ISU Grand Prix of Figure Skating, a senior-level international invitational competition series. It was held at Patinoire Polesud in Grenoble on November 23–25. Medals were awarded in the disciplines of men's singles, ladies' singles, pair skating, and ice dancing. Skaters also earned points toward qualifying for the 2018–19 Grand Prix Final.

Entries
The ISU published the preliminary assignments on June 29, 2018.

Changes to preliminary assignments

Records 

The following new ISU best scores were set during this competition:

Results

Men

Ladies

Pairs

Ice dancing

References

External links
 2018 Internationaux de France at the International Skating Union

Internationaux de France
Internationaux de France
Internationaux de France
Internationaux de France
Sports competitions in Grenoble